The President and His Granddaughter is a 2000 Russian comedy film directed by Tigran Keosayan. Participant of the main competition of the XII ORKF Kinotavr (Special Prize of the Jury).

Plot
On a blizzard New Year's Eve, a fatal event took place. In the hospital delivered a young woman, who began premature birth as a result of a car accident. The happening was complicated by the fact that the father-in-law of the mother was a well-known general who, threatening weapons to doctors, demanded the birth of a healthy grandson. To death a terrified doctor, in front of which the fierce general waved his name pistol, finds the only way out.

One of the two twin girls, born with a single mother, a future artist, is declared the general's granddaughter. December 31, 2000 on the Kremlin tree meet the daughter of the artist and granddaughter of the new president of the Russian Federation! The princess and the beggar, of course, change places.

Cast
 Oleg Tabakov as Russian President
 Nadezhda Mikhalkova as Masha (daughter of  painter) and Masha (granddaughter of  President)
 Dina Korzun as Tatyana, mother of girls 
 Vladimir Ilyin as Sasha
 Aleksandr Adabashyan as Doctor, subsequently Minister of Health
 Alyona Khmelnitskaya as wife of a doctor
 Vladimir Vdovichenkov as  president's guard

Production 
The filming and renting of the film was preceded by serious differences between the production company and screenwriter Elena Rayskaya, as the author of the script, who originally offered it to the producers with the condition of their own directing. Having signed a contract with Rayskaya, the company eventually dismissed her on the basis of creative disagreements, transferring the shooting to Tigran Keosayan. Having filed a lawsuit for copyright infringement, Elena Rayskaya achieved a resolution banning filming before the end of the trial, and then the court's decision to ban the film company from using the author's name and original script name, as well as to promulgate the film created on its basis. Nevertheless, the film was released in the rental.

References

External links

 The President and His Granddaughter on KinoPoisk

Russian comedy films
2000 comedy films
2000 films
Films set around New Year
Films about twin sisters
Cultural depictions of Boris Yeltsin